Practical Classics, started in 1980, is a British magazine about classic cars. It focuses on affordable classic cars for the man in the street, as well as more expensive and exotic cars that have now become affordable. It has always had a strong emphasis on DIY and showing the skills and tools needed for restoration, maintenance and repairs. The editorial staff all have old cars that they work to keep running. The magazine features a price guide and buyer's guides to specific models. Bauer Consumer Media, publishers of Practical Classics, claim an ABC audited circulation of 48,033 (July–December 2012).

References

External links
 Official website

1980 establishments in England
Automobile magazines published in the United Kingdom
Bauer Group (UK)
Magazines established in 1980
Mass media in Peterborough
Monthly magazines published in the United Kingdom